Lene Vågslid (born 17 March 1986) is a Norwegian teacher and politician for the Labour Party. She was elected a member of the Parliament of Norway for Telemark in 2013 after having served as a deputy representative during the term 2009–2013.

She hails from Tokke and has been a member of Telemark county council.

On 23 March 2022, she and Åsmund Grøver Aukrust were appointed new deputy parliamentary leaders in the aftermath of Terje Aasland’s appointment to the government.

References

1986 births
Living people
People from Tokke
Deputy members of the Storting
Members of the Storting
Labour Party (Norway) politicians
Politicians from Telemark
Women members of the Storting
21st-century Norwegian politicians
21st-century Norwegian women politicians